Frank Emmons Overton (March 12, 1918April 24, 1967) was an American actor. He was best known for the roles of Maj. Harvey Stovall in Twelve O'Clock High (1964-1967), Sheriff Heck Tate in To Kill a Mockingbird (1962) and General Bogan in Fail Safe (1964).

Early life
Overton was born in Babylon, New York on March 12, 1918.

Career
Overton's acting career began on the stage in New York City. His Broadway credits include The Desperate Hours (1954), The Trip to Bountiful (1953), Truckline Cafe (1945) and Jacobowsky and the Colonel (1943).
Peter Gunn TV series 5/30/1960 , season 2 episode 35 " Letter of the Law". Played district attorney Henry Lockwood. 

Overton appeared in numerous television programs during the early 1950s and through the late 1960s. In 1959, he appeared in an episode of The Twilight Zone with Gig Young, called "Walking Distance". Overton also appeared in the episode titled "Mute" as Sheriff Harry Wheeler with Ann Jillian.  Other TV work included The Fugitive in 1963. 

He played Sheriff Heck Tate in the 1962 film To Kill a Mockingbird. In 1964, he played General Bogan in the film Fail Safe.  

Overton appeared in an episode of the 1961 ABC series The Asphalt Jungle. He made two guest appearances on the CBS courtroom drama series Perry Mason in diverse roles. In 1961 he played a priest, Father Paul, in "The Case of the Renegade Refugee", and in 1963 he played Deputy D.A. Nelson Taylor in "The Case of the Bluffing Blast". Overton played Major Harvey Stovall in the TV series Twelve O'Clock High.

Overton also played a significant role in the movie Wild River, where he appeared as the jilted fiancé of Lee Remick. 

One of his last TV roles was that of Elias Sandoval in Star Trek's  "This Side of Paradise", which originally aired in March 1967, just one month before his death at age 49.

Personal life
In 1962, Overton married actress Phyllis Hill in Los Angeles.

Death
Overton died after a heart attack in 1967 in Pacific Palisades, California. He was survived by his wife, Phyllis Hill, and a daughter. He is interred at Hollywood Forever Cemetery, in the Garden of Memory (formerly Section 6), L-44, with his wife, who died in 1993.

Filmography

References

External links

 
 

 

1918 births
1967 deaths
20th-century American male actors
American male film actors
American male television actors
Burials at Hollywood Forever Cemetery
Male actors from New York (state)
People from Babylon, New York